Chiang Khong is a district (amphoe) in the northeastern part of Chiang Rai province, northern Thailand.

Geography
The Phi Pan Nam mountains and their wide intermontane basins dominate the landscape of the district. The 1,328 m high Doi Luang Pae Mueang massif (ดอยหลวงแปเมือง) rises west of Chiang Khong town. The Mekong River flows at the northern end of the district, partially forming the boundary with Laos. Another important river is the Ing, a tributary of the Mekong.

Neighboring districts are (from the southeast clockwise): Wiang Kaen, Khun Tan, Phaya Meng Rai, Wiang Chiang Rung, Doi Luang and Chiang Saen of Chiang Rai Province. To the east is Bokeo province of Laos.

Administration

Central administration 
Chiang Khong is divided into seven subdistricts (tambons), which are further subdivided into 102 administrative villages (mubans).

Missing numbers belonged to the tambons which now form Wiang Kaen District.

Local administration 
There are seven subdistrict municipalities (thesaban tambons) in the district:
 Bun Rueang consisting of subdistrict Bun Rueang.
 Wiang Chiang Khong consisting of parts of subdistrict Wiang.
 Wiang consisting of parts of subdistrict Wiang.
 Khrueng consisting of subdistrict Khrueng.
 Huai So consisting of subdistrict Huai So.
 Sathan consisting of subdistrict Sathan.
 Si Don Chai consisting of subdistrict Si Don Chai.

There is one subdistrict administrative organization (SAO) in the district:
 Rim Khong consisting of subdistrict Rim Khong.

References

External links

amphoe.com

Chiang Khong
Laos–Thailand border crossings
Populated places on the Mekong River